Macau law is broadly based on Portuguese law, and therefore part of the civil law tradition of continental European legal systems. Portuguese law is itself highly influenced by German law. However, many other influences are present, including Chinese law, Italian law, and some narrow aspects of common law.

Macau's legal code is written in Portuguese; therefore law students at University of Macau take their classes in Portuguese.

Constitutional law
The apex of the legal system is the Basic Law of the Macau SAR, a Chinese law approved in accordance with and due to the Sino-Portuguese Joint Declaration on the Question of Macau (an international treaty that is officially deposited at the UN) and with article 31 of the Constitution of the PRC. Within Macau, the Basic Law has constitutional rank. The Basic Law of Macau is modelled upon the Basic Law of Hong Kong, although it is not totally equal, as it namely is influenced by the Portuguese Constitution in some points as, for example, in some norms concerning fundamental rights. The International Covenant on Civil and Political Rights applies in Macau.

The transfer of power
The legal system of Macau was not substantially modified in 1999, as a result of the transfer of power from Portugal to the PRC, given that there is a principle of continuity of the pre-existing legal system, according to which all sources in force prior to the transfer of sovereignty continued to apply, with some minor exceptions that were specified in December 1999.

Judicial system
The courts of the Macau SAR are structured in three levels and have final power of adjudication, except in very narrow areas. The Court of Final Appeal has three judges, and the Court of Second Instance has five judges. Trial by jury is foreseen in the law, but is not used.

Prior to 1991, Macau judicial system was a sub-judiciary district of the judicial framework of the Portuguese legal system and was affiliated to the Judiciary District of Lisbon (Judicial da Comarca de Lisboa).

By 2018 none of the criminal court judges were Portuguese. In 2018 Reuters stated: "Courts have largely stopped providing Portuguese translations."

High Court

The Higher Court of Justice (Superior Court of Justice) of Macau replaced the role of Court of Appeal of the Judiciary District of Lisbon. This highest court would be replaced by the current Court of Appeal in 1999.

The courts prior to the handover in 1999:

 Superior Council of Magistrates
 Superior Council of Public Prosecutors
 Court of Justice of Macau
 Criminal Preliminary Hearing Court of Macau
 Administrative Court of Macau
 Constitutional Court of the Republic of Portugal
 Supreme Administrative Court of the Republic of Portugal
 Supreme Court of Justice of the Republic of Portugal
 Audit Court of the Republic of Portugal

The courts of Macau consist of:

 Court of Final Appeal – 終審法院/Tribunal de Ultima Instância
 Court of General Competence
 Administrative Court (Tribunal Administrativo)
 Criminal Preliminary Hearing Court – (Juizos de Instrução Criminal)
 Audit Court
 Higher Court of Justice
 Judiciary Council of Macau (Tribunal Judicial de Base)
 Court of Second Instance or Court of Appeal (Tribunal de Segunda Instância)
 Court of First Instance (Tribunais de Primeira Instância)
 Primary Court of Macau – 初級法院/(Tribunal Judícial de Base)
 Judiciary Council of Macau (Conselho dos Magistrados Judíciais)

Macau as a civil law legal system
Macau is typically a civil law legal system, in that legislation is the main source of law and case law, while clearly relevant, is not a major source of law. Macau has the five 'classic' codifications: the Civil Code, the Commercial Code, the Civil Procedure Code, the Penal Code, the Criminal Procedure Code. In addition, there are a number of other smaller codifications (e.g., in the field of administrative law).

Private law
Private law in Macau is basically codified in two separate codes: the 1999 Civil Code and the 1999 Commercial code. A number of other pieces of legislation, such as the law on standard contract terms, are also of importance. The Commercial Code has been translated into English and is freely available in the website of the Macau Official Printing House (see link below). For a partial translation of the Civil Code, see the bibliography below.

Legal education
The Faculty of Law of the University of Macau was created in the late 1980s and currently offers law degrees and master programmes conducted in Chinese and Portuguese languages. It also offers two master and postgraduate programmes in English, one in EU, international and comparative law, and the other in international business law . In addition, it offers PhD programs in law.

Legal Department
The Public Prosecutions Office (檢察院; Ministério Público) is the judicial authority of Macau. It is led by a prosecutor general and assisted by an assistant-prosecutor general. Day to day legal activities are performed by general prosecutors.

Gaming law
Macau gaming law is discussed in a separate entry.

Law field employees
In 2018 Macau had 49 jurists, with ten being Portuguese. Reuters stated in 2018 that according to "experts", "the government was increasingly hiring only Chinese for jobs as lawyers, advisers and jurists."

See also
Legal systems of the world
Civil law (legal system)
Civil code
Commercial code
Immigration to Macau

References

Further reading

External links

 Macau Law Directory (Government Printing Bureau)
 Traditional Chinese version
  Portuguese version
   (No longer live as of 7 September 2018)
  Macau Courts
  Faculty of Law, University of Macau
  Personal page of Prof. Jorge Godinho, University of Macau
  Links to sites of legal interest
 Brief Introduction of Judicial System of Macau

Macau law